Ghulam Mohammad Vastanvi  is an Indian Muslim scholar and former Vice-Chancellor of Darul Uloom Deoband. He was instrumental in reforming madrasa education by introducing subjects like medicine and engineering to Darul Uloom institutions. He was dismissed as the Vice Chancellor of Darul Uloom Deoband some said that it was because he praised modi but he denied it. Deoband institution also denied this. and he was the first person to be removed earlier than had they voluntarily resigned, or died in office. However, Vastanvi decided not to challenge his removal in the courts.

Life and career
Vastanvi graduated from the Mazahir Uloom. He had been removed from the Maharashtra State waqf board in 2018 for illegal possession of waqfs land in Ahmednagar for his institution He had been charged for this illegal action of possessing a waqfs land; consequently the state government had ordered the criminal action against Vastanvi.

References 

Living people
Year of birth missing (living people)
Vice-Chancellors of Darul Uloom Deoband
Mazahir Uloom alumni